Juan Núñez may refer to:
 Juan Núñez de Prado (grand master of Calatrava) (died 1355), Portuguese noble
 Juan Núñez de Prado (conquistador) ( - ), conquered Tucumán Province in what is now Argentina
 Juan Núñez de la Peña (1641–1721), priest and historian of colonization
 Juan Núñez (tennis) (born 1956), tennis player from Chile
 Juan Núñez (athlete) (born 1959), Dominican Republic Olympic runner
 Juan Núñez (basketball), Spanish basketball player
 Juan Carlos Núñez Armas (born 1964), Mexican politician
 Juan Carlos Núñez (born 1983), Mexican footballer
 Juan Aguilera Núñez (born 1985), Spanish professional footballer for SD Huesca 
 Juan Gilberto Núñez (born 1986), Colombian footballer

Other uses
 Casas de Juan Núñez, Spanish municipality

See also
 Juan Núñez de Lara (disambiguation)